The Super-heavy tank Panzerkampfwagen IX and Panzerkampfwagen X were silhouette conceptual drawings in an edition of the German World War II Signal military magazine. The drawings were not based on any actual designs, and were solely printed to deceive Allied intelligence.

References

Super-heavy tanks
World War II tanks of Germany